Liberal Party of Australia leadership spill, 2015 may refer to: 

 Liberal Party of Australia leadership spill motion, February 2015
 Liberal Party of Australia leadership spill, September 2015